Giyeok (sign: ㄱ; Korean: 기역), also known as kiŭk (Korean: 기윽) in North Korea, is one of the KoreanHangul. The Unicode for giyeok is U+3131. Depending on its position, it makes a 'g' or 'k' sound. At the beginning and end of a word it is usually pronounced [k], while after a vowel it is [g]. The IPA pronunciation is [k].

Stroke order

Other communicative representations

References 
 

Hangul jamo